Valdez is a city in the Chugach Census Area in the U.S. state of Alaska. According to the 2020 US Census, the population of the city is 3,985, up from 3,976 in 2010. It is the third most populated city in Alaska's Unorganized Borough.

The city was named in 1790 after the Spanish Navy Minister Antonio Valdés y Fernández Bazán. A former Gold Rush town, it is located at the head of Port Valdez on the eastern side of Prince William Sound. The port did not flourish until after the road link to Fairbanks was constructed in 1899. It suffered catastrophic damage during the 1964 Alaska earthquake, and is located near the site of the disastrous 1989  Exxon Valdez oil tanker spill. Today, it is one of the most important ports in Alaska, a commercial fishing port as well as a freight terminal. Valdez is also the terminus for the Trans-Alaska Pipeline System.

History

The port of Valdez was named in 1790 by the Spanish explorer Salvador Fidalgo after the Spanish naval officer Antonio Valdés y Fernández Bazán. A scam to lure prospectors off the Klondike Gold Rush trail led to a town being developed there in 1898. Some steamship companies promoted the Valdez Glacier Trail as a better route for miners to reach the Klondike gold fields and discover new ones in the Copper River country of interior Alaska than that from Skagway. The prospectors who believed the promotion found that they had been deceived. The glacier trail was twice as long and steep as reported, and many men died attempting the crossing, in part by contracting scurvy during the long cold winter without adequate supplies. The town did not flourish until after the construction of the Richardson Highway in 1899, which connected Valdez and Fairbanks. With a new road and its ice-free port, Valdez became permanently established as the first overland supply route into the interior of Alaska. The highway was open in summer-only until 1950, when it started operating as a year-round route.

In 1907, a shootout between two rival railroad companies ended Valdez's hope of becoming the railroad link from tidewater to the Kennicott Copper Mine. The mine, located in the heart of the Wrangell-St. Elias Mountains, was one of the richest copper ore deposits on the continent. The exact location of the right-of-way dispute, in which one man was killed and several injured, is located at the southern entrance of Keystone Canyon on the Valdez side.  A half-completed tunnel in the canyon marks the end of railroad days in Valdez. A rail line to Kennicott was later established from the coastal city of Cordova.

Good Friday earthquake
The city of Valdez was badly shaken and damaged in the 1964 Good Friday earthquake. Soil liquefaction of the glacial silt that formed the city's foundation led to a massive underwater landslide, which caused a section of the city's shoreline to break off and sink into the sea. All 32 people died as the dock collapsed into the ocean with the violent landslide. There were no deaths in the town.

The new construction was supervised by the Army Corps of Engineers. They transported 54 houses and buildings by truck to the new site, to re-establish the new city at its present location. The original town site was dismantled, abandoned and eventually burned down.

Trans-Alaska pipeline
From 1975 to 1977, the Trans-Alaska pipeline was built to carry oil from the Prudhoe Bay oil fields in northern Alaska to a terminal in Valdez, the nearest ice-free port.  Oil is loaded onto tanker ships for transport.  The construction and operation of the pipeline and terminal boosted the economy of Valdez.  The first tanker to be loaded with pipeline oil was the ARCO Juneau in early August 1977, bound for the Cherry Point Refinery in 

The 1989 Exxon Valdez oil spill occurred as the oil tanker Exxon Valdez was leaving the terminal at Valdez full of oil. Although the oil did not reach Valdez, it devastated much of the marine life in the surrounding area. The clean-up of the oil caused a short-term boost to the economy of Valdez.

2014 avalanches
On January 24, 2014, a major avalanche occurred just outside Valdez at Mile 16 near Keystone Canyon, prompting the closure of the only highway in or out of town. On January 25, Alaska DOT triggered another massive slide that further choked the roadway. Due to weather conditions at the time, the avalanche dammed the Lowe River, creating a half-mile-long lake that stalled snow removal efforts for nearly a week. The blockage was dubbed the "Damalanche" by local city officials after a name coined by local resident, Joshua Buffington. News of this event spread to media outlets nationwide. Once the water receded, crews worked around the clock to clear about 200,000 cubic yards of snow in five days. No one was injured during this incident.

Geography

Valdez is located near the head of a deep fjord in the Prince William Sound in Alaska. It is surrounded by the Chugach Mountains, which are heavily glaciated; nearby Shoup Glacier, which feeds Shoup Bay, served as a source of ice for residents of the town at the turn of the 20th century. Valdez is the northernmost port in North America that is ice-free year-round. The northernmost point of the coastal Pacific temperate rain forest is in Valdez, on Blueberry Hill. The only road access is via the Richardson Highway, which traverses Thompson Pass and Keystone Canyon to end at Valdez.

Climate
Despite the presence of temperate rainforest, Valdez under the Köppen climate classification has a subarctic climate (Dfc): its winters, though much warmer than most climates of this type, are not sufficiently mild, as those of, say, Ketchikan, Kodiak, or even nearby Cordova are, to fit into the oceanic or subpolar oceanic climate category.

Demographics

Valdez first appeared on the 1900 U.S. Census as the unincorporated village of "Valdes." It formally incorporated as Valdez in 1901, and has reported in every successive census. The original townsite was relocated in 1967 from the east side to the north side of Port Valdez after the 1964 Good Friday Earthquake, but still lays within the present city limits.

As of the 2010 United States Census, there were 3,976 people living in the city. The racial makeup of the city was 78.6% White, 0.6% Black, 7.6% Native American or Alaska Native, 1.9% Asian, 0.8% Pacific Islander and 5.8% from two or more races. 4.7% were Hispanic or Latino of any race.

As of the census of 2000, there were 4,036 people, 1,494 households, and 1,042 families living in the city.  The population density was 18.2 people per square mile (7.0/km2).  There were 1,645 housing units at an average density of 7.4 per square mile (2.9/km2).  The racial makeup of the city was 83.62% White, 0.42% Black or African American, 7.19% Native American or Alaska Native, 2.18% Asian, 0.45% Pacific Islander, 1.41% from other races, and 4.73% from two or more races.  3.96% of the population were Hispanics or Latinos of any race.

There were 1,494 households, out of which 41.5% had children under the age of 18 living with them, 56.4% were married couples living together, 8.4% had a female householder with no husband present, and 30.2% were non-families. 21.8% of all households were made up of individuals, and 2.8% had someone living alone who was 65 years of age or older.  The average household size was 2.66 and the average family size was 3.15.

The age distribution shows 29.7% of the population under the age of 18, 7.3% from 18 to 24, 33.2% from 25 to 44, 26.4% from 45 to 64, and 3.5% who were 65 years of age or older.  The median age was 35 years. For every 100 females, there were 107.9 males.  For every 100 females age 18 and over, there were 107.0 males.

The median income for a household in the city was $66,532, and the median income for a family was $74,188. Males had a median income of $56,932 versus $31,855 for females. The per capita income for the city was $27,341.  About 5.0% of families and 6.2% of the population were below the poverty line, including 5.3% of those under age 18 and 11.4% of those age 65 or over.

Economy
Valdez is a fishing port, both for commercial and sport fishing. Freight moves through Valdez bound for the interior of Alaska. Sightseeing of the marine life and glaciers, together with both deep-sea fishing, and heli skiing support a tourist industry in Valdez. The oil from the Trans-Alaska pipeline is loaded onto ships at the Valdez oil terminal.

Alyeska Pipeline Service Company is one of the biggest employers in Valdez.

Valdez is connected to the interior of Alaska by the Richardson Highway, and is a port of call in the Alaska Marine Highway ferry system. Just north of Valdez on the highway is Thompson Pass, which has spectacular waterfalls and glaciers next to the highway. Thompson Pass is also known for treacherous driving conditions during the winter.

The Valdez Airport, also known as Pioneer Field, has regular scheduled service with Ravn Alaska.  

Valdez hosted the World Extreme Skiing Championship (WESC) in the early 1990s.

Media and culture
Despite its small size, Valdez was at one time home to two weekly newspapers, the Valdez Star and the Valdez Vanguard. In 2004, the Star bought out the Vanguard.

Valdez is also home to radio broadcasters KCHU, KVAK, and KVAK-FM.

Valdez is also home to the Last Frontier Theatre Conference, hosted by the Prince William Sound College. The annual conference attracts playwrights and actors from around the United States.

On Deadly Ground (1994) was filmed near Worthington Glacier, as well as the Valdez Civic Center and Valdez Airport, and  outside Valdez on Thompson Pass in the Chugach Mountains.

Oil terminal

The Valdez Marine Terminal is an oil port in Valdez, at the southern end of the Alaska Pipeline. The terminal was the point of departure for the Exxon Valdez just prior to the oil spill.

There are 14 active aboveground crude oil storage tanks at the terminal, and an average of three to five oil tankers depart from the terminal each week. Since the pipeline became operational in 1976, more than 15,000 tankers full of oil have left the terminal.

The terminal has 2 operational loading berths.

Notable people

 Neva Egan (1914–2011), first First Lady of Alaska (1959–1966, 1970–1974)
 William A. Egan (1914–1984), first Governor of Alaska (1959–1966, 1970–1974)
 Robert Campbell Reeve (1902–1980), Valdez-based bush pilot; founder of Reeve Aleutian Airways
 Bill Walker (born 1951), former Governor of Alaska
 Ed Walker (1917–2011), second-to-last surviving member of Castner's Cutthroats, former member of the Valdez city council

See also
 Tanerliq
 Valdez Blockade
 Valdez High School

Footnotes

References

External links
 
 Visitor information
 Tourism information
 Valdez Museum & Historical Archive
 Maxine & Jesse Whitney Museum

Cities in Alaska
Cities in Chugach Census Area, Alaska
Exxon Valdez oil spill
Mining communities in Alaska
Populated coastal places in Alaska on the Pacific Ocean
Populated places established in 1898